Elijah Howarth FRAS (1853 – 1 April 1938) was an English museum curator.

Howarth was the son of a labourer. In 1871 he started work at the Liverpool Museum. His early exhibition work helped establish the Walker Art Gallery and allowed him to develop his skills as an art conservator. He was also trained in astronomy by John Couch Adams.

In 1876 he was appointed curator at newly opened Sheffield City Museum in Weston Park. He went on to set up the Weston Park Observatory in 1880 and two years later developed the Weston Park Weather Station. He also founded the Mappin Art Gallery and High Hazels Museum.

He was the founding editor of the Museums Journal, which he edited from 1901 to 1909.

He was also an active freemason.

References

1853 births
1938 deaths
English Museologists
English curators
English Freemasons